Rovde is a former municipality in Møre og Romsdal county, Norway.  The  municipality existed from 1905 until its dissolution in 1964. Rovde included the area on both the north and south sides of the Rovdefjorden.  The northern area on the island of Gurskøya is currently part of Sande Municipality and the southern area is part of Vanylven Municipality. Rovde Church was the main church for the municipality. The administrative centre of the municipality was the village of Rovdane.

History

The municipality of Rovde was established on 1 January 1905 when the old municipality of Sande was split in two with the eastern part becoming Rovde and the rest remained as Sande. Rovde had an initial population of 610, and included the villages of Larsnes and Rovdane. During the 1960s, there were many municipal mergers across Norway due to the work of the Schei Committee. On 1 January 1964, the municipality of Rovde was dissolved.  The southern district of Rovde (Rovdestranda—south of the Rovdefjorden) with 436 inhabitants was merged into the neighboring Vanylven Municipality. The rest of Rovde, on Gurskøya island, with 562 inhabitants, was reunited with Sande.

Name
The municipality (originally the parish) is named after the old Rovde farm.

Government
All municipalities in Norway, including Rovde, are responsible for primary education (through 10th grade), outpatient health services, senior citizen services, unemployment and other social services, zoning, economic development, and municipal roads.  The municipality is governed by a municipal council of elected representatives, which in turn elects a mayor.

Municipal council
The municipal council  of Rovde was made up of 17 representatives that were elected to four year terms.  The party breakdown of the final municipal council was as follows:

Poem
{| class="wikitable"
|-
! colspan="2" |Rovdestranda, by the poet J. Nordhagen, 1928.
|-
! English language !! Norwegian language
|-
| Sailor go from Stadt to the northon a brilliant sunny day,steer with courage from the ocean into the fjord,how calm becomes the sea.Then gaze from the bow rightwardsshade your eyes for better to seethe cloudfree mountains under heaven,and calm under them all lies Rovdestranden.

From Søvdsnes to Kleiven along the brave way northare tended farms, where the people dwell.Yes, a finer place you can hardly findthan beautiful Rovdestranda.
|
|}

See also
List of former municipalities of Norway

References

Vanylven
Sande, Møre og Romsdal
Former municipalities of Norway
1905 establishments in Norway
1964 disestablishments in Norway